Martin Oliver "Mo" Waldron (February 2, 1925 – May 27, 1981) was an American newspaper reporter. His 1963 series of articles in the St. Petersburg Times exposed the state's  "reckless, unchecked spending" on the construction of the Sunshine State Parkway, and was recognized with the 1964 Pulitzer Prize for Public Service. At his death he was the bureau chief for The New York Times in Trenton, New Jersey, the state capital.

Early life and education
Waldron was born on February 2, 1925, in Calcasieu Parish, Louisiana, and grew up there. He attended Middle Georgia College, Georgia Institute of Technology and Atlanta Law School, and was awarded his undergraduate degree from Birmingham–Southern College.

Career
He worked as a reporter at The Atlanta Constitution, Birmingham Age-Herald / Birmingham Post-Herald, and The Tampa Tribune, gradually shifting to a focus on investigative reporting.

Waldron was with the St. Petersburg Times in 1963, when he wrote a series of articles (a total of 150,000 words) as part of the newspaper's coverage of unchecked spending by the Florida Turnpike Authority (FTA). The FTA caused an estimated quadrupling of the cost to taxpayers, from initial estimates of $100 million. Waldron received a tip about excessive spending by FTA Chairman John Hammer, including allegations that he had paid for expensive hotels and meals, and corsages for his secretary, as well as overcharges for a chartered plane.

As part of his efforts to see how much it would take to spend $30 on a meal in 1963 —when two could dine opulently for $15 —Waldron and a colleague went to an expensive Miami restaurant. They ordered Caesar salads, sirloin steaks, desserts and two brandies, and hit their $30 target by paying for the glasses the brandy came in and adding a $5 tip. His coverage earned the newspaper the Pulitzer Prize for Public Service in 1964, its first Pulitzer. It resulted in changes in the way the state of Florida managed highway construction projects.

Waldron moved to The New York Times in 1966, becoming the paper's bureau chief in Trenton, New Jersey (capital of the state). His final reporting for the paper was about the development of casinos in Atlantic City, New Jersey, and their relationships with local municipal government. Arthur Gelb, then deputy managing editor for The Times, recalled that "if Mo Waldron was in town there would be a party somewhere and everybody from the mayor down would be there".

Waldron died at age 56 on May 27, 1981, at his home in Hightstown, New Jersey, due to heart disease. He was survived by his wife, author Ann Waldron, as well as a daughter and three sons.

References

1925 births
1981 deaths
American male journalists
The New York Times writers
Birmingham–Southern College alumni
People from Calcasieu Parish, Louisiana
People from Hightstown, New Jersey
20th-century American non-fiction writers
Journalists from Alabama
20th-century American male writers
20th-century American journalists